Aediesia  is a genus of African plants in the Vernonieae tribe within the daisy family.

 Species
 Aedesia engleriana Mattf. - Cameroon
 Aedesia glabra (Klatt) O.Hoffm. - tropical Africa from Senegal to Tanzania
 Aedesia spectabilis Mattf. - Cameroon

References

Asteraceae genera
Vernonieae